Cochin Shipyard Ltd (CSL) is one of the largest shipbuilding and maintenance facility in India. It is part of a line of maritime-related facilities in the port-city of Kochi, in the state of Kerala, India. Of the services provided by the shipyard are building platform supply vessels and double-hulled oil tankers. The company has Miniratna status.

History
Cochin Shipyard was incorporated in 1972 as a Government of India company, with the first phase of facilities coming online in 1982.

In August 2012, the Government of India announced plans of divestment to raise capital of Rs. 15 billion for further expansion through an initial public offering (IPO) towards the end of the fiscal year. The government finalised the decision of stake sale on 18 November 2015. 33.9 million  shares will be sold, out of which the government is holding  shares while the others are fresh equity. However, this did not materialise until August 2017, when the company conducted its IPO and listed its shares on the BSE and NSE.

Activities
The yard has facilities to build vessels up to 1,10,000 deadweight tonnage (DWT) and repair vessels up to 1,25,000 DWT.

Shipbuilding

 
The first ship to roll out of the Cochin Shipyard was the MV Rani Padmini in 1981.

CSL has secured shipbuilding orders from internationally renowned companies from Europe and the Middle East. The shipyard is building six  bulk carriers for Clipper Group of the Bahamas and the first three vessels have been launched.

Eight platform supply vessels for the Norwegian Seatankers Management Company, are also under construction.

INS Vikrant

Cochin Shipyard built India's first indigenous aircraft carrier.  (formerly, the Project 71 "Air Defence Ship") is the first aircraft carrier of the Indian Navy to be designed and built in India. The carrier will be the largest warship built by CSL. In February 2020, all major structural and outfitting work was declared complete. On 4 August, sea trials finally began. Five day long sea trials were successfully completed on 8 August 2021. On 2 September 2022, The ship was commissioned.

Ship repair
The shipyard started offering ship repair services in 1982 and has undertaken upgrades and repairs for all types of ships including ships for the oil exploration industry as well as scheduled maintenance and life extension for ships of the Indian Navy, Indian Coast Guard, the Union territory of Lakshadweep, Fisheries and Cochin Port Trust, SCI and the Oil and Natural Gas Corporation (ONGC). It has performed major overhauls for the aircraft carrier, INS Viraat.
It has also performed major overhauls for the aircraft carrier INS Vikramaditya two times on 2016 and 2018 respectively. 
Recently CSL was awarded major maintenance and upgrade orders from ONGC. This included major overhaul of three rigs, Mobile Offshore Drilling Unit (MODU) Sagar Vijay, Mobile Offshore Drilling Unit Sagar Bhushan and Jackup rig Sagar Kiran.

Others
The shipyard also trains graduate engineers in marine engineering. Around one hundred students are trained each year.

References

External links 

 

Shipbuilding companies of India
Shipyards of India
Companies based in Kochi
Ports and harbours of Kerala
Government-owned companies of India
Transport in Kochi
1972 establishments in Kerala
Vehicle manufacturing companies established in 1972
Companies listed on the National Stock Exchange of India
Companies listed on the Bombay Stock Exchange